Curling clubs in the Canadian province of Prince Edward Island are organized into the Curl PEI. The province has seven clubs:

Charlottetown Curling Club - Charlottetown
Cornwall Curling Club - Cornwall
Crapaud Community Curling Club - Crapaud
Maple Leaf Curling Club - O'Leary
Montague Curling Club - Montague
Silver Fox Curling and Yacht Club - Summerside
Western Community Curling Club - Alberton

 Prince Edward Island
Curling clubs
  
Curling in Prince Edward Island
Prince Edward Island